William Rogers (1497/98 – 1553), of Norwich, Norfolk, was an English politician.

He was a Member of Parliament (MP) for Norwich in 1542 and mayor of the city in 1542–43.

References

1498 births
1553 deaths
Politicians from Norwich
Mayors of Norwich
English MPs 1542–1544